Dostyk Railway station is located in Dostyk, Kazakhstan, the border of China and Kazakhstan, a spur line railway station of Kazakhstan Temir Zholy. The old name of the station in the Soviet Union era was Druzhba, meaning "friendship" in Russian; in 2007 it was renamed to Dostyk, a Kazakh word with the same meaning.

The Chinese standard gauge (1,435 mm) is different from the Kazak broad gauge (1,520 mm) which means that a break-of-gauge is required in this station.

See also 
 Turkestan–Siberia Railway
 Aktogay railway station
 Alashankou railway station

References 

Railway stations in Almaty Region
Railway stations opened in 1954
Almaty Region